Elizabeth Subercaseaux Sommerhoff (born 1945) is a Chilean journalist and writer.

Biography
Elizabeth Subercaseaux grew up near Cauqenes, Chile at her grandparents' home called Santa Clara. Subercaseaux's father died in 1956, when he was 42 years old and she was 11. The five children of the marriage – Bernardo and Juan, older than Elizabeth, and Martin and Ximena, younger – were brought up by their mother, the sculptor, painter, and photographer Gerda Sommerhoff, who was a German and grew up in Holland. She is the great-great-granddaughter of the German composer Robert Schumann and Clara Wieck.

After finishing high school in 1967, she traveled to Spain with her first husband, from whom she would be separated seven years later and with whom she had three children: Angelica, Alejandra, and Carlos Lavín Subercaseaux.

Career
Elizabeth Subercaseaux began her journalistic career as a contributor to the Nuevo Diario of Madrid.

On her return to Chile in 1974, she served as director of the children's magazine El Peque, taught at the University of Chile's School of Journalism, and performed interviews for the magazines Cosas, Apsi, Master, and Caras.

In 1990 she traveled to the United States, where she currently lives with her husband, Spanish-American literature professor, literary critic, and translator, John J. Hassett. There, in addition to continuing to write for various media, she has been a lecturer. She is a regular contributor to Ocean Drive magazine, and the newspapers La Nación of Santiago and Al Día of Philadelphia.

For 18 years she was a columnist for the magazine Vanidades Continental. "La Tia Eulogia", her humor column, was very successful in Latin America.

Subercaseaux has been a columnist, interviewer, and reporter in various media, including the magazines Apsi, Cosas, Caras, Cuadernos Cervantes, El Sábado, Vanidades Continental, Master, and Vivir Mejor. She has been a correspondent for the BBC, as well as for the Colombian magazine Semana and the Argentine .

It has been noted that "her work, mainly testimonial, is of political and social criticism of her country, with permanent concern for human rights and for the role of Chilean women in the last decades."

She has been cited as a major force in guiding public opinion about Augusto Pinochet, especially in grassroots movements. After attempting to arrange an interview with him for fifteen years, Subercaseaux finally received a chance to interview the dictator in 1988. In interviews with Subercaseaux after her time in Chile, she speaks of the great terror felt by uncensored journalists in Chile during the time of Pinochet's dictatorship. Subercaseaux was beaten by police on her own street when she lived in Chile. Half of her family was in exile during Pinochet's reign.

Her first book of fiction, the story compilation Silendra, was published in 1986, though she claims to have been writing since age 10. In 1988 her first novel, El canto de la raíz lejana, was published. Since then this has been her main genre, and she has written 25 books, among which are humor features, novels (two of crime fiction), and books of short journalistic pieces.

Subercaseaux's Barrio Alto series – the books Vendo casa en el Barrio Alto (2009), Compro Lago Caburga (2011), and Clínica Jardín del Este (2013) – constitute a portrait of Chilean society at the beginning of the 21st century.  included the first in his book of essays Las novelas de la oligarquía chilena. The second novel, a continuation of the portrait of the upper class to which Subercaseaux herself belongs, was well received by critics and repeated the successful sales of Vendo casa en el Barrio Alto. The critic Camilo Marks wrote:

Of the associations some reviewers have made between public figures and her fictitious characters, Subercaseaux herself said of Clínica Jardín del Este:

Her works have been translated into several languages, including English, German, Korean, French, Dutch, Portuguese, and Italian. A Week in October: a novel is her first book to be translated into English, translated by Marina Harss.

Awards
 First Prize of the National Association of Hispanic Publications of the United States for best story, for her report "Los hongos de la ira, historia de una larga explotación" (The Mushrooms of Wrath, History of a Long Exploitation) which first appeared in Al Día in 2001, about the 20-year legal battle waged by Mexican mushroom growers in Pennsylvania
 LiBeratur Prize 2009 for Una semana de octubre, award for the best novel of the year (in translation) from Asia, Africa, and Latin America

Works

Journalism
 Los generales del régimen, interview, 1983, with Malú Sierra and Raquel Correa
 Del lado de acá, interviews, Galinost, Santiago, 1986 
 Ego sum Pinochet, interview, Zig-Zag, Santiago, 1989; with Raquel Correa
 La comezón de ser mujer, chronicles, Planeta, Santiago, 1994
 Las diez cosas que una mujer en Chile no debe hacer jamás, chronicles, Planeta, Santiago, 1995
 Eva en el mundo de los jaguares, chronicles,  Aguilar, Altea, Taurus y Alfaguara, Buenos Aires, 1998
 Gabriel Valdés, señales de historia, interview, Aguilar, Santiago, 1998
 Mi querido papá, Sudamericana, Santiago, 2001
 Las diez cosas que un hombre en Chile debe hacer de todas maneras, Catalonia, Santiago 2003 
 Michelle, interview, Catalonia, Santiago 2005 (RBA Libros, Barcelona, 2006); with Malú Sierra
 Evo: despertar indígena, interview, LOM, Santiago 2007; with Malú Sierra

Narrative
 Silendra, short stories, Las Ediciones del Ornitorrinco, Santiago, 1986 (reissued by Alfaguara México, 2000)
 El canto de la raíz lejana, novel, Planeta, Santiago, 1988 (reissued by Andrés Bello, Santiago, 2001)
 El general azul, novel, Ediciones B, Buenos Aires, 1991
 Matrimonio a la chilena, novel, Alfaguara, 1997
 Una semana de octubre, novel, Grijalbo, México, 1999 (reissued by Suma de Letras, Madrid, 2010)
 La rebelión de las nanas, novel, Grijalbo Mondadori, Santiago, 2000
 Un hombre en la vereda, novel, Sudamericana, Santiago, 2001
 Reporteras, novel, Catalonia, 2005
 Asesinato en La Moneda, novel, Planeta, Santiago, 2007 
 Asesinato en Zapallar, novel, Planeta, Santiago, 2007 
 Vendo casa en el Barrio Alto, novel, Catalonia, Santiago, 2009
 Un affaire casi perfecto, novel, 2010
 Las confidentes, novel, Suma/Aguilar, 2010
 Compro Lago Caburga, novel, Catalonia, Santiago, 2011
 La última noche que soñé con Julia, crime fiction, Suma de Letras, Santiago, 2012 
 Clínica Jardín del Este, novel, Catalonia, Santiago, 2013
 La música para Clara, novel, Sudamericana, Santiago, 2014 
 La pasión de Brahms, novel, Sudamericana, Santiago, 2016
 La patria de cristal, novel, Catalonia, Santiago, 2017
 La patria estremecida, novel, Catalonia, Santiago 2019

References

1945 births
20th-century Chilean women writers
21st-century Chilean women writers
20th-century Chilean novelists
21st-century Chilean novelists
Chilean expatriates in the United States
Chilean journalists
Chilean women novelists
Chilean people of French descent
Chilean people of German descent
21st-century Chilean short story writers
Chilean women journalists
Chilean women short story writers
Living people
Academic staff of the University of Chile
Subercaseaux family